"Now That We're Alone" is a song written and recorded by American country music artist Rodney Crowell.  It was released in October 1990 as the fourth single from the album Keys to the Highway.  The song reached number 17 on the Billboard Hot Country Singles & Tracks chart.

Chart performance

References

1990 singles
Rodney Crowell songs
Songs written by Rodney Crowell
Song recordings produced by Tony Brown (record producer)
Song recordings produced by Rodney Crowell
Columbia Records singles
1989 songs